Tabanus eggeri is a Mediterranean species of biting horse-fly, found in southern France, Italy, Albania, Croatia, Herzegovina, Bulgaria, Portugal and Morocco. There are also unverified accounts of sightings in Spain and Israel.

References

Tabanidae
Diptera of Europe
Insects described in 1868
Taxa named by Ignaz Rudolph Schiner